This is a compilation of every international soccer game played by the United States men's national soccer team from 1960 through 1969. It includes the team's record for that year, each game and the date played. It also lists the U.S. goal scorers.

The format is: home team listed first, U.S. listed first at home or neutral site.

Records are in win–loss–tie format. Games decided in penalty kicks are counted as ties, as per the FIFA standard.

1960

1961

1962

1963

1964

1965

1966

1967

1968

1969

External links
 USA - Details of International Matches 1885-1969
  USA Men's National Team: All-time Results, 1885-1989
  U.S. SOCCER FEDERATION 2016 MEN’S NATIONAL TEAM MEDIA GUIDE

1960
1959–60 in American soccer
1960–61 in American soccer
1961–62 in American soccer
1963–64 in American soccer
1965–66 in American soccer
1967 in American soccer
1968 in American soccer
1969 in American soccer